Dragovich may refer to:

People

Fictional characters
 Lana Dragovich, a fictional character from the webseries Girltrash!
 Nikita Dragovich, a fictional character from the videogame Call of Duty: Black Ops
 Razlan Dragovich, a fictional character from the TV series The Unit, see List of The Unit characters

Other uses
 Dragovich v. Department of the Treasury, No. 10-1564 (N.D. Cal.), see Defense of Marriage Act#Other cases

See also
 Dragovic (disambiguation)
 Dragovići (disambiguation)
 Drago (disambiguation)